Virus Called The Blues was a 30-minute documentary spoof based on a day in the life of blues and jazz guitarist/songwriter Billy Jenkins and his band The Blues Collective. The documentary was produced, directed by Craig Duncan who met Billy on the set of the BBC Two music series 'Jazz 606' in the mid nineties (filmed at the famous Jazz Venue 606 Club). It features serious interviews and spoof action, plus actual performance from the band at The Blue Elephant Theatre, Camberwell, South-east London. Also visible in the audience is stand up comedian Stewart Lee, a long-time friend of Jenkins.

Overview 
The title of the documentary came from the title of Charles Brown song 'Virus Called The Blues', a version of which is available on the 2002 album 'Blues Zero Two' by Billy Jenkins.

The story in the programme follows this pattern: Jenkins convinces his band to do a one off benefit gig to raise money to purchase better lighting in the street surrounding the Theatre. During the run up to the gig the band lose the location of the venue while out in the groups Reliant Robin. As a result,  the audience are left waiting. Bandleader Billy Jenkins argues with the band and bass player Thad Kelly walks out.

In reality this was a genuine benefit gig and for the most part, a true story and as a result funds were raised and better lighting has since been installed since the documentary was made.

The film was edited by Noel Curry and the Promo was edited by Mike Latham.

Cast members
Billy Jenkins - electric guitar and voice
Dylan Bates - electric violin
Richard Bolton - electric guitar
Thad Kelly - electric and double bass
Mike Pickering - drumkit

See also 
 The Oxcentrics jazz band
 Voice Of God Collective

External links 
 Billy Jenkins website
 Billy Jenkins' MySpace page
 Babel Label website
 Vortex website
 Guitar tonewood chart Dylan Bates
 Virus Called The Blues Part I on YouTube
 Virus Called The Blues Part II on YouTube
 Virus Called The Blues Part III on YouTube

Documentary films about blues music and musicians
British documentary films
1990s English-language films